Matthieu Onoseke Wembi (born 18 March 1988) is a football player who played for SC Cilu.

His only cap for the Congo DR national football team was in Kinshasa on 22 August 2007 in a friendly match against Angola. He also scored the first goal of the match.

Onoseke participated in the 2009 African Nations Championship finals.

References

1988 births
Living people
Democratic Republic of the Congo footballers
Democratic Republic of the Congo international footballers
Association football forwards
SC Cilu players
21st-century Democratic Republic of the Congo people